This is a list of buildings that are examples of the Art Deco architectural style in Oregon, United States.

Eugene 
 Knight Library, Eugene, 1937
 McCracken Brothers Motor Freight Building, Eugene, 1946
 Schaefers Building, Eugene, 1929
 United States Post Office, Eugene, 1939
 W.O.W. Hall, Eugene, 1932

Grants Pass 
 Grants Pass Steam Laundry, Grants Pass, 1903
 Redwoods Hotel, Grants Pass, 1926
 Rogue Theatre, Grants Pass, 1938

Gresham 
 Gresham High School Agricultural Building, Gresham, 1940
 Gresham High School Auditorium, Gresham, 1940
 Gresham High School Gymnasium, Gresham, 1940

Hood River 
 Butler Bank, Hood River, 1924
 Keir Medical Building, Hood River, 1927
 United States Post Office, Hood River, 1935

Klamath Falls 
 First National Bank, Klamath Falls, 1930
 Golden Rule (former JC Penney Building), Klamath Falls, 1937
 Klamath County Armory and Auditorium (now Klamath County Museum), Klamath Falls, 1935
 Oregon Bank Building, Klamath Falls, 1929
 Ross Ragland Theater (former Esquire Theater), Klamath Falls, 1940
 United States National Bank, Klamath Falls, 1937
 Winema Hotel, Klamath Falls, 1930

Medford 
 Central Medford High School, Medford, 1931
 Cora Knight Addition, Medford, 1930s
 Craterian Theater, Medford, 1924
 Fluhrer Bakery Building, 29 North Holly Street, Medford, 1933
 Hamlin Building East, Medford, 1886 and 1939
 Harry & David Building, Medford, 1937
 Hight Realty, Medford, 1947
 Holly Theatre, Medford, 1930
 Hubbard Hardware/Woods Building, Medford, 1913 and 1941
 J. C. Penney Building, Medford, 1948
 Jackson County Courthouse, Medford, 1932
 Johnson Market Groceteria, Medford, 1927
 Leever Motor Company, Medford, 1947
 Pacific Greyhound Bus Depot, Medford, 1948
 Safeway/Littrell Auto Parts, Medford, 1936, 1945
 Tayler–Phipps Building (now a shoe store), Medford, 1909 and 1937
 Vawter–Brophy Building, Medford, 1907 and 1940s
 Warner, Wortman & Gore Building, Medford, 1900 and 1927
 Washington Elementary School, 610 South Peach Street, Medford, 1931 and 1949
 Winetrout/Crater Lake Ford Building, Medford, 1946
 Young/Humphrey Motors, Medford, 1936

Portland 
 Aladdin Theatre, Portland, 1927
 Avalon Theater, Portland, 1925
 Bagdad Theatre, Portland, 1927
 Bertha M. and Marie A. Green House, Portland, 1937
 Canterbury Castle, Portland, 1931
 Capri Apartments, Alphabet Historic District, Portland 1932
 Charles F. Berg Building, Portland, 1902 and 1930
 Coca-Cola Building, Portland, 1941
 Commodore Hotel, Portland, 1925
 Eastside Mortuary Building, Portland, 1930
 Hollywood Theatre, Portland, 1926
 Jantzen Knitting Mills Company Building, Portland, 1929
 Jeanne Manor Apartment Building, Portland, 1931
 Jensen Investment Company Building, Portland, 1930
 Harry A. and Gerda Johnson Building, Kenton Commercial Historic District, Portland, 1922
 Kenyon Building, Kenton Commercial Historic District, Portland, 1951
 Laurelhurst Theater, Portland, 1923
 Metropolitan Apartments, Portland, 1930
 Moreland Theatre, Portland, 1926
 Morris & Lizzie Goldstein Building, Kenton Commercial Historic District, Portland, 1923
 Park Regent Apartments, Portland, 1930
 Portland Art Museum, Portland, 1932
 Regent Apartments, Portland, 1937
 Roseway Theater, Portland, 1924
 St. Johns Signal Tower Gas Station, Portland, 1954
 Sunshine Dairy Plant, Portland, 1936
 Terminal Sales Building, Portland, 1927
 Volunteers of America, East Portland Grand Avenue Historic District, Portland, 1930

Salem 
 Corban University Library, Salem, 1935
 Elsinore Theatre, Salem, 1926
 Grand Theatre (former Grand Drugs and International Order of Odd Fellows Building), Salem, 1900 and 1947
 Old West Salem City Hall, Salem, 1935
 Oregon State Capitol, Salem, 1936
 State Library of Oregon, Salem, 1939

Other cities 
 Alger Theatre, Lakeview, 1940
 Ashland Springs Hotel, Ashland, 1925
 Baker City Tower, Baker City, 1929
 Big Creek Bridge, Heceta Head, 1931
 Cameo Theatre, Newberg, 1937
 Captain Robert Gray School, Astoria
 Celebration Center (former Port Theater), North Bend
 City Hall, Mt. Angel
 Clackamas County Courthouse, Oregon City, 1936
 Coos Art Museum (former Marshfield Post Office), Coos Bay, 1936
 Corvalis High School, Corvallis, 1935
 Cottage Grove Armory, Cottage Grove, 1931
 Dayton High School, Dayton, 1935
 Eltrym Theater, Baker City, 1940
 Forest Theatre, Forest Grove
 Harbor Theatre, Florence, 1938
 Harney County Courthouse, Burns, 1940
 Hub Department Store Building, Coos Bay, 1926 and 1941
 The Hub Restaurant (now Surefire Design), Albany, 1940s
 Isaac Lee Patterson Bridge, Gold Beach to Wedderburn, 1932
 John Jacob Astor Hotel, Astoria, 1923
 Joy Cinema & Pub, Tigard, 1939
 Kuhn Cinema, Lebanon, 1935
 Leaburg Power Plant, Lane County, 1930
 Mack Theater, McMinnville, 1942
 Midway Theatre, Newport
 Milton Odem House, Redmond, 1941
 Owyhee Dam, Adrian, 1932
 Palace Theatre, Silverton, 1935
 Pine Theater, Prineville, 1938
 Rio Theatre, Sweet Home, 1950
 Seaside Building, Seaside
 Siuslaw River Bridge, Florence, 1936
 Springdale School, Springdale, 1931
 Springfield Motors Buick Dealership, Springfield, 1952
 Ten Mile Creek Bridge, Lane County, 1931
 Tillamook City Hall (former Tillamook Post Office), Tillamook, 1942
 Toledo History Center (former Toledo City Hall), Toledo
 Tower Theater, Bend, 1940
 Union Pacific Station, Nyssa, 1940s
 United States Post Office, Ontario
 Varsity Theatre, Ashland, 1937
 Vista House, Corbett, 1918
 Wilson River Bridge, Tillamook, 1931

See also 
 List of Art Deco architecture
 List of Art Deco architecture in the United States

References 

 "Art Deco & Streamline Moderne Buildings." Roadside Architecture.com. Retrieved 2019-01-03.
 Cinema Treasures. Retrieved 2022-09-06
 "Court House Lover". Flickr. Retrieved 2022-09-06
 "New Deal Map". The Living New Deal. Retrieved 2020-12-25.
 "SAH Archipedia". Society of Architectural Historians. Retrieved 2021-11-21.

External links 
 

 
Art Deco
Art Deco architecture in Oregon
Oregon-related lists